The Seal of Excellence for Handicrafts is awarded to handicraft products annually by UNESCO.

The programme operates separately in several Asian regions: South East Asia, Central Asia, South Asia and East Asia. Although initiated and generally coordinated by UNESCO, several partner NGOs implement the program at regional and national levels. Products are submitted annually between April and June and judging takes place in September by an international panel of experts selected by UNESCO.

The stated objective of the Seal is to encourage artisans to produce handicrafts using traditional skills, patterns and themes in an innovative way, in order to ensure the continuity and sustainability of these traditions and skills. The program was established to promote the handicraft sector, which play an important economic and social role in developing countries. The award aims to promote sustainable livelihoods as well as encourage the continued use of traditional knowledge.

Products can be submitted in one of 7 categories:
 Textiles
 Natural Fibre
 Ceramics
 Wood
 Stone
 Metal
 Other (including paintings)

Judging criteria
The products are judged according to a number of set criteria. The general criteria, which was updated for 2007, includes

 Excellence: Demonstrated excellence and standard-setting quality in craftsmanship
 Authenticity: Expression of cultural identity and traditional aesthetic values
 Innovation: Innovative approach to design and production
 Eco-friendliness: Respect for the environment in materials and production techniques
 Marketability: The potential of the item in world markets

Pre-conditions include considerations of social responsibility in product, and that the product classify as a handicraft according to the definition that appears on UNESCO Bangkok's Seal of Excellence website

History
The Seal was launched in South East Asia in 2001. In 2004 it expanded to Central Asia and South Asia, and to East Asia in 2006. Future expansion is planned for other regions of the world.

External links
 UNESCO Bangkok: Seal of Excellence site

UNESCO
Handicrafts